Amy (sometimes called Our Girl Amy) is an American syndicated gag cartoon centering on a young, blond girl with a pony tail. Created by Harry Mace on October 2, 1961, it was originally syndicated by the Register and Tribune Syndicate. Mace was later joined on the strip by Jack Tippit, but Mace left the strip in 1964. Tippit continued alone on the strip until it ended in 1991.

Tippit received the National Cartoonists Society Newspaper Panel Cartoon Award for the strip for 1970.

References

Notes

Sources consulted 
 Strickler, Dave.  Syndicated Comic Strips and Artists, 1924-1995: The Complete Index. Cambria, CA: Comics Access, 1995.  .

External links
 NCS Awards

1961 comics debuts
1991 comics endings
American comics characters
American comic strips
Child characters in comics
Comics about women
Comics characters introduced in 1961
Gag-a-day comics
Gag cartoon comics
Female characters in comics